George Nicolaou (born 16 September 1945) is a Cyprus judge born in Larnaca and currently the Judge of the European Court of Human Rights in respect of Cyprus

References

1945 births
Living people
20th-century Cypriot judges
Judges of the European Court of Human Rights
Cypriot judges of international courts and tribunals
21st-century Cypriot judges